Itäharju is a district in the Itäharju-Varissuo ward of the city of Turku, in Finland. It is located to the east of the city centre, and consists mostly of industrial area, brownfields and low-density residential area. Since the beginning of the 2000s the trend of renovating old industrial buildings to offices has sprawled over from the neighboring Kupittaa to Itäharju as well.

The current population of Itäharju is 2,940, and it is decreasing at an annual rate of 0.78%. 16.19% of the district's population are under 15 years old, while 15.54% are over 65. The district's linguistic makeup is 93.20% Finnish, 5.07% Swedish, and 1.73% other.

See also
 Districts of Turku
 Districts of Turku by population

External links

Districts of Turku